Azar was a class of nine patrol boats that was built in Italy for the Imperial Iranian Navy. The boats were named Azar, Chahab, Derakhsh, Navak, Peykan, Tondar, Tondbad, Toufan and Tousan. Built in the early 1950s, all probably were stricken in the 1970s.

See also 
 List of naval ship classes of Iran

References 

Ships of the Imperial Iranian Navy
Ships built in La Spezia
Patrol boat classes